Volterrano may refer to:
 Volterrano (Città di Castello), a Frazione in central Italy
 Raffaelo Volterrano, an Italian humanist
 Baldassare Franceschini, an Italian painter who is mostly known as "Volterrano" 
 Berlinghiero Berlinghieri, an Italian painter who is also known as Berlinghiero Volterrano